Tupale is a village in Serbia. It is located in the Medveđa municipality, in the Jablanica District. According to the 2002 census, the town had a population of 725. Of these, 723 (99,72 %) were ethnic Albanians, and 2 (0,27 %) others.

Notable people 
Idriz Ajeti

References

Populated places in Jablanica District
Medveđa
Albanian communities in Serbia